Gastone Puccioni (17 August 1926 – 19 December 1994) was an Italian field hockey player. He competed in the men's tournament at the 1952 Summer Olympics.

References

External links
 

1926 births
1984 deaths
Italian male field hockey players
Olympic field hockey players of Italy
Field hockey players at the 1952 Summer Olympics
Sportspeople from Genoa